The Ark is a BBC One programme, aired as a television film, broadcast on 30 March 2015, which retells the story of Noah.

Cast
 David Threlfall as Noah
 Joanne Whalley as Emmie
 Ashley Walters as The Angel
 Don Warrington as Paul
 Michael C. Fox as Shem
 Ian Smith as Ham
 Andrew Hawle as Japheth
 Nico Mirallegro as Kenan
 Emily Bevan as Salit
 Hannah John-Kamen as Nahlab
 Georgina Campbell as Aris
 Antonia Thomas as Sabba

References

External links

2015 in British television
BBC television dramas
English-language television shows
British religious television series
Noah's Ark in television
Noah's Ark in film